The Somali elephant shrew or Somali sengi (Galegeeska revoilii) is a species of elephant shrew in the family Macroscelididae.

Habitat
Its natural habitat is arid and semiarid desert with rocky substrates and sparse shrubs. In some parts of Somalia, the Somali sengi and rufous sengi (G. rufescens) may be locally sympatric. It is found in the northern Horn of Africa; it was formerly thought to be exclusively endemic to Somalia, but a 2020 sighting also indicates they are found in Djibouti and potentially Ethiopia.

Classification
It was formerly classified in the genus Elephantulus, but a 2020 study found it to be the sister taxon of the clade containing the genera Petrodromus and Petrosaltator; and the genus Galegeeska was coined for it.

Disappearance and rediscovery
The Somali sengi was among the 25 "most wanted lost" species that were the focus of Global Wildlife Conservation's “Search for Lost Species” initiative. On 18 August 2020, 50 years after it was last seen and recorded, it was announced that a population had been found in Djibouti, the first documented since 1968.

References

Elephant shrews
Mammals of Somalia
Endemic fauna of Somalia
Mammals described in 1881
Taxonomy articles created by Polbot
Taxobox binomials not recognized by IUCN